The 2022 Copa Libertadores qualifying stages were played from 8 February to 17 March 2022. A total of 19 teams competed in the qualifying stages to decide four of the 32 places in the group stage of the 2022 Copa Libertadores.

Draw

The draw for the qualifying stages was held on 20 December 2021, 12:00 PYST (UTC−3), at the CONMEBOL Convention Centre in Luque, Paraguay.

Teams were seeded by their CONMEBOL Clubs ranking as of 16 December 2021 (shown in parentheses), taking into account the following three factors:
Performance in the last 10 years, taking into account Copa Libertadores and Copa Sudamericana results in the period 2012–2021.
Historical coefficient, taking into account Copa Libertadores and Copa Sudamericana results in the period 1960–2011 and 2002–2011 respectively.
Local tournament champion, with bonus points awarded to domestic league champions of the last 10 years.

For the first stage, the six teams were drawn into three ties (E1–E3), with the teams from Pot 1 hosting the second leg.

For the second stage, the 16 teams were drawn into eight ties (C1–C8), with the teams from Pot 1 hosting the second leg. Teams from the same association cannot be drawn into the same tie, excluding the three winners of the first stage, which will be seeded in Pot 2 and whose identity will not be known at the time of the draw, and may be drawn into the same tie with another team from the same association.

Notes

For the third stage, the eight winners of the second stage were allocated without any draw into the following four ties (G1–G4), with the team in each tie with the higher CONMEBOL ranking hosting the second leg.

Second stage winner C1 vs. Second stage winner C8
Second stage winner C2 vs. Second stage winner C7
Second stage winner C3 vs. Second stage winner C6
Second stage winner C4 vs. Second stage winner C5

Format

In the qualifying stages, each tie is played on a home-and-away two-legged basis. If tied on aggregate, extra time is not played, and a penalty shoot-out is used to determine the winner (Regulations Article 2.4.3).

Bracket

The qualifying stages are structured as follows:
First stage (6 teams): The three winners of the first stage advance to the second stage to join the 13 teams which are given byes to the second stage.
Second stage (16 teams): The eight winners of the second stage advance to the third stage.
Third stage (8 teams): The four winners of the third stage advance to the group stage to join the 28 direct entrants. The four teams eliminated in the third stage enter the Copa Sudamericana group stage.
The bracket was decided based on the first stage draw and second stage draw, which was held on 20 December 2021.

Winner G1

Winner G2

Winner G3

Winner G4

First stage
The first legs were played on 8 and 9 February, and the second legs were played on 15 and 16 February 2022.

|}

Match E1

Tied 1–1 on aggregate, Barcelona won on penalties and advanced to the second stage (Match C5).

Match E2

Bolívar won 7–2 on aggregate and advanced to the second stage (Match C3).

Match E3

Olimpia won 3–0 on aggregate and advanced to the second stage (Match C8).

Second stage
The first legs were played on 22–24 February, and the second legs were played on 1–3 March 2022.

|}

Match C1

Fluminense won 4–1 on aggregate and advanced to the third stage (Match G1).

Match C2

Estudiantes won 2–1 on aggregate and advanced to the third stage (Match G2).

Match C3

Universidad Católica won 3–1 on aggregate and advanced to the third stage (Match G3).

Match C4

Tied 3–3 on aggregate, América Mineiro won on penalties and advanced to the third stage (Match G4).

Match C5

Barcelona won 3–0 on aggregate and advanced to the third stage (Match G4).

Match C6

The Strongest won 3–2 on aggregate and advanced to the third stage (Match G3).

Match C7

Everton won 3–1 on aggregate and advanced to the third stage (Match G2).

Match C8

Olimpia won 4–2 on aggregate and advanced to the third stage (Match G1).

Third stage
The first legs were played on 8–10 March, and the second legs were played on 15–17 March 2022.

|}

Match G1

Tied 3–3 on aggregate, Olimpia won on penalties and advanced to the group stage.

Match G2

Estudiantes won 2–0 on aggregate and advanced to the group stage.

Match G3

The Strongest won 2–1 on aggregate and advanced to the group stage.

Match G4

Tied 0–0 on aggregate, América Mineiro won on penalties and advanced to the group stage.

Notes

References

External links
CONMEBOL Libertadores 2022, CONMEBOL.com
CONMEBOL Libertadores

1
February 2022 sports events in South America
March 2022 sports events in South America